The Saint Louis Priory School, a Catholic secondary day school for boys, is located on a 150-acre campus in Creve Coeur, St. Louis County, Missouri, within the Archdiocese of Saint Louis.  The school is run by the Benedictine monks of Saint Louis Abbey as part of their religious ministry.

History 
The school was established in 1956, at the invitation of St. Louis Catholics, by monks of the Benedictine Ampleforth Abbey in Yorkshire, England. The corresponding Priory of Saints Louis and Mary (now Saint Louis Abbey), a Benedictine monastery, was established in 1955.  The Priory, which is a member of the English Benedictine Congregation, became independent of Ampleforth in 1973, and was elevated to an Abbey in 1989.

The founding Prior (1955–1967) was Reverend Columba Cary-Elwes, an author, monastic leader, and former titular Abbot of Westminster. The founding headmaster was scholar and author Rev. Timothy Horner, O.S.B., who also founded the school's first athletic team, the Rebel Ruggers. 

The history of the monastery and school was chronicled by founding monk and original headmaster Fr. Timothy Horner, O.S.B., in his In Good Soil: The Founding of the Saint Louis Priory School 1954–1973 (2001). In this history, Horner describes the initial contact with the interested St. Louis Catholic laymen, and explains the process of founding a new school in the English Benedictine Congregation.

As Father Timothy notes in In Good Soil, the purpose of school, as conceived by the lay St. Louis Catholics who initiated the project, was to "offer its students a Catholic-college preparatory education of the highest excellence so as to enter the colleges, universities, and technical schools of their choice." By the middle of the 20th century, Catholics had gone to great lengths to develop their own educational system and were expected to support it, so the fact that the school was founded with a view to sending its alumni to non-Catholic colleges was something of a departure for the time. More than sixty years after its founding, the purpose of the school remains remarkably consistent with the vision of its founders. According to its website, the school exists to "provide a Benedictine, Catholic, college preparatory education of the highest excellence so as to help talented and motivated young men develop their full potential as children of God."

Headmasters
 Rev. Timothy Horner, OSB 1956–1974
 Rev. Paul Kidner, OSB 1974–1983
 Rev. Finbarr Dowling, OSB 1983–1992
 Rev. Thomas Frerking, OSB 1992–1995
 Rev. Gregory Mohrman, OSB 1995–2005 (First Priory alumnus to join the monastery and serve as Headmaster, class of 1976)
 Rev. Michael Brunner, OSB 2005–2012
 Rev. Linus Dolce, OSB 2012–2014
 Rev. Gregory Mohrman, OSB 2014–2018 (Elected as Abbot of Saint Louis Abbey in 2018)
 Rev. Cuthbert Elliott, OSB 2018–present (Second Priory alumnus to serve as Headmaster, class of 2002)

Academics
Priory offers an education shaped by the Benedictine order's tradition of Christian humanism, with particular attention to Catholic theology, classical (Latin and Greek) and modern foreign languages (French, Spanish, and Mandarin Chinese), English and American literature, mathematics and the natural sciences, history, computer science, and the fine arts (vocal music, studio art, theater arts/communication, photography, stained glass art, and mass media and video production).

Students have the option to take up to 14 advanced placement courses. Honors classes begin with foreign languages in 8th grade, and in other disciplines beginning in high school. To graduate, students in their senior year must submit one of three types of theses: a research project, a work of creative writing, or a project in the visual or performing arts. Students must also participate in service to the community in order to graduate.

In 2017, the school announced that the Class of 2018 had six students - nearly 10% of the class - obtain a perfect score of 36 on the ACT with over 44% of the class earning a 33 or higher, placing them in the top 2% nationally. The average ACT score for the class was a 32. Additionally, 16 students were named National Merit Semifinalists, the highest percentage (25%) of any school in Missouri.

The online site Niche ranked Priory as the 2016-2023 Best Catholic high school and Best All Boys high school in the St. Louis Metro area and state of Missouri. It was ranked the 7th Best Catholic school in the United States in 2016; in 2017, it was ranked the 5th Best Catholic school and 10th Best All Boy's High School in the entire United States.

The Washington Post ranked Priory second, and the top private school, in Missouri, in its 2016 list of "America's Most Challenging High Schools."

Abbey Church

The Abbey Church was constructed in 1962 and was finished on September 7, 1962. It is also known as the Church of the Abbey of St. Mary and St. Louis. It was designed by Gyo Obata of Hellmuth, Obata and Kassabaum. The church's circular facade consists of three tiers of whitewashed, thin-shell concrete parabolic arches, the top one forming a bell-tower. The arches appear to float upward from their grassy base. They are faced with dark insulated-fiberglass polyester window walls, which create a meditative translucency when viewed from within.

The church holds a 14th-century sculpture of the Madonna and Christ child, a 17th-century holy font in the Della Robbia style, and modern sacred art by artists from the United States, Great Britain, Spain, and France. The 2007 AIA|CPC Design Committee bestowed its Twenty-five Year Award on the Abbey Church/Priory Chapel.

On the grounds outside the church are life-size sculptures of the abbey's patron saints, Saint Benedict by Lithuanian-born artist Wiktor Szostalo, and the Holy Blessed Virgin Mother Mary, Our Lady of Grace, by American sculptor Philip Howie. The Abbey Church serves as the home church for the Saint Louis Archdiocese parish of Saint Anselm.

Extracurricular
Priory offers a range of extracurricular offerings for its students. These include the Record newspaper and Shield yearbook, opportunities to perform in theater and musical dramas, a Scholar Bowl academic competition team that participates in local and state tournaments, Model UN, and student government.
 
The Junior Engineering Technical Society  (JETS) hosts an annual competition, known as TEAMS, aimed at "challenging high school students in grades 9-12 to work together as a team to apply knowledge learned in the classroom to real-world engineering scenarios."  Priory has performed well over the years in this competition, including a national championship in 2000.

Priory also hosts a robotics club with Visitation Academy, the ViPrs, that often does well in the annual local FIRST Robotics Competition. In 2010, the team took second place at the St. Louis Regional competition and in 2011 the team was again successful placing third. In 2013, the team won the Rockwell Collins Innovation & Control Award for their creative use of an overlay on the robot's camera to enable the human controller to scope targets more easily. The team won the Excellence in Engineering award in 2015 and placed highly in the Kansas City and St. Louis Regional competition.

The school is home to the Guild of Saint Columbkille, a medieval arts guild in which students can participate in stained glass, calligraphy, and heraldry. After demonstrating a certain level of proficiency, students may earn the title of "Master."

Additionally, Priory hosts a student-led Sodality of Our Lady, a religious organization that fosters in its participants a closer personal and community relationship with the Blessed Virgin Mary. The Priory Sodality is dedicated in particular to Our Lady of Walsingham.

Priory serves as one of two St. Louis-area sites for AIM High, a program that offers an academic and personal enrichment program for motivated middle school students from high-risk environments. The program involves Priory faculty members, parents, and students.

Sports 
Priory's mascot is the Ravens. Abbot Gregory Mohrman, O.S.B., an alumnus of the school from the class of 1976 and a former headmaster, explained the mascot's significance: “Some people have been asking us, why a raven? ... Saint Gregory the Great, in his story of the life and miracles of Saint Benedict, recounts how Benedict had a pet raven, who used to come every evening to be fed bread from Benedict’s own hand. Once, when Benedict was given poisoned bread by a disgruntled and envious priest, Benedict told the raven to take the poisoned bread and drop it in a place where no one could find it. The raven obeyed and returned for his nightly treat. The raven’s bravery and obedience ultimately saved others from the wrath of a wicked man.”

When the school was founded, the sports mascot was the Saints. In the '60s, "under the influence of a charismatic history teacher who specialized in the Civil War", it was changed to the Rebels, referencing the Confederate States of America. Initially, this link was obvious and the students used Confederate symbols to show pride in their sports team, including a giant painting of General Beauregard on the gym walls. Over time, this link weakened and explicit symbols of the Confederacy went away. In 2020, the mascot was officially changed to the Ravens.

Priory is a member of the suburban Metro League, which was reconstituted out of the former ABC League. Priory students are required to participate in a sport each of the three seasons. In the fall, the school offers cross country, football, and soccer. In the winter, the school offers basketball, ice hockey, and wrestling. Students may choose to participate in the winter musical in order to fill their sports requirement. The ice hockey team is a club team that is not sponsored by the school or state, and since the dissolution of hockey clubs at two nearby public schools, Parkway North and Parkway Central, it regularly features non-Priory students on its team. However, according to a rule change starting in the 2009–2010 school year, it now fulfills the sports requirement for the winter term. In the spring, the school offers golf, track and field, tennis, rugby, baseball, lacrosse, and ultimate frisbee. Although the school has racquetball and squash facilities, it does not field teams in these sports, nor does it have a swimming and diving team, as it once did.

In the winter of 2004, the hockey team received a bid to play in the Wickenheiser Cup, a memorial tournament hosted by the Mid-States Club Hockey Association league and named for the late St. Louis Blues Center Doug Wickenheiser. Priory won the championship game, played at the Scottrade Center, giving the school its first state sports title since 1973.  In 2007, the hockey team won the Wickenheiser Cup for the second time.<ref>[http://prepsports.stltoday.com/stltoday/emaf.nsf/Popup?ReadForm&db=ssi\prep\stories2007.nsf&docid=5C2FADA2C5D9829E8625728F001DCC97 Saint Louis Post-Dispatch, "CBC routs Chaminade for ninth championship", February 27, 2007.]</ref>

In the fall of 2005, the Priory varsity soccer team became the first in this sport in Missouri's high school sports history, and the first since state titles were officially sanctioned by the Missouri State High School Activities Association, to compete for a full season with no losses or ties.  The soccer Rebels led by All-American forward Jimmy Holmes ended the season with a perfect 26-0-0 record, winning the state Class 2 title. In November 2011, the soccer Rebels again produced a perfect season, finishing 27-0-0 and winning the Missouri State High School Class 2 championship with a 2-0 victory over Trinity High School. In so doing they became the only school in Missouri high school soccer history to twice post a perfect season, with no losses and no ties. The soccer Rebels' team record included 24 shutouts, and they outscored opponents 107-5.

In the spring of 2007, the Priory golf team won its first state title, winning by 27 shots. The final team score was 583.

A little over half a decade after establishing a lacrosse program, Priory's varsity lacrosse team won its first Missouri Scholastic Lacrosse Association state title in 2016 by defeating O'Fallon (Illinois) 7-6 in the double overtime Division II championship final.http://stlouisreview.com/article/2016-06-01/trust-fun-had-role St. Louis Review, "Trust, fun had role in Priory lacrosse's success"

 Recognition 

Missouri State High School Athletic Association (MSHSAA) Titles:
 Football: 1973
 Cross Country: 2004
 Soccer: 2005 (The first soccer team in MSHSAA history to go undefeated at 26-0-0), 2011 (undefeated season, 27-0-0), 2017
 Golf: 2007 (2nd lowest 36-hole total (583) for par 71-hole course in MSHSAA history), 2018
 Tennis: 2021
Mid-States Club Hockey Association State Titles:
 Hockey: 2004, 2007, 2022 (Wickenheiser Cup)
Missouri Scholastic Lacrosse Association (MSLA) State Title:
 Lacrosse: 2016 (Division II)
Missouri State High School Boys' Ultimate Championship Title:
 Ultimate: 2019

Academic State Titles
 Scholar Bowl Academic Competitions: 1999, 2009, 2010, 2012, 2013 
 Mock Trial: 2007 (the team went on to place fourth in the National Competition)

Notable alumni
Government and politics
 Carl J. Artman (1983), Assistant Secretary for Indian Affairs, United States Department of the Interior, 2007–2008
 John A. Heffern (1972), United States Ambassador to Armenia, 2011–2014, Principal Deputy Assistant Secretary, US Department of State Bureau of European Affairs, 2015–present
 D. John Sauer (1993), Rhodes Scholar, Solicitor General of Missouri

Business
Tom Baldwin (1974), bond trader and investor; founded the Baldwin Group
 William K. "Billy" Busch (1978), (son of Anheuser-Busch chairman and Saint Louis Cardinals baseball team owner August A. Busch Jr.), founder of William K. Busch Brewing Co.
William Donius (1977), President and CEO, Pulaski Bank
 Preston Henske (1982), Managing Partner, Bain & Company New York
 Thomas Schlafly (1966), co-founder of Saint Louis Brewery (creators of Schlafly beer)
 John Leonard Harris (1980), Founder and President of charitable nonprofit organization, Encouragement Unlimited, Inc. (www.encouragementunlimited.org), popular keynote and conference speaker, pastor, author (Practical Wisdom: Learning Life's Lessons from the Simple but Profound Things We Hear Every Day), actor and poet.
 David Wehner (1986), CFO of Meta Platforms

Sports and entertainment
 Kevin Kline (1965), Academy Award-winning actor
John Klein  (1983), pro soccer player, St. Louis University Billikens Athletics Hall of Fame, Columbia College Soccer Coach
 Dave Holmes (1989), MTV VJ and reality TV show host
 Benjamin R. Noll (2000), NFL offensive lineman; had stints with the St. Louis Rams, Dallas Cowboys, and Detroit Lions

Arts and sciences
 David Linzee (1971), author and mystery writer (Death in Connecticut, Belgravia, Discretion: A Novel, and Spur of the Moment)
 Stephen Lockhart (1974), Rhodes Scholar, healthcare executive, and anesthesiologist
 Eddy L. Harris (1974), author (Mississippi Solo, Native Stranger, South of Haunted Dreams, and Still Life in Harlem), and filmmaker (River to the Heart'')
 Thomas L. Delworth (1976), a fellow of the American Geophysical Union who received the 2021 Bert Bolin Award for Climate research
 John Keene (1983), MacArthur Fellow, writer, translator, professor, and artist

References

External links
St. Louis Priory School
Saint Louis Priory Rugby Club (Kwai Nyu Rugby Club)
Priory Robotics Team - The Roborebels
Ampleforth Abbey

Educational institutions established in 1955
Roman Catholic secondary schools in St. Louis County, Missouri
Benedictine secondary schools
Boys' schools in Missouri
Schools of the English Benedictine Congregation
Private middle schools in Missouri
1955 establishments in Missouri
Roman Catholic Archdiocese of St. Louis
Gyo Obata buildings